The Newbery-Vautin chlorination process is a process to extract gold from its ore using chlorination. The process was developed by James Cosmo Newbery and Claude Vautin.

Background
Extracting and reducing gold locked in pyrite in gold ores, via its absorption in chlorine gas, is a process that was first introduced by Karl Friedrich Plattner around 1848. At the time, this process promised to revolutionize gold extraction. Due to numerous reasons, it was found that only experienced chemists could successfully execute this process.  

The presence of lime and magnesia in the quartz is a drawback of this process, as they would react with the chlorine without producing any results. Earthy particles would settle and surround the small gold and prevent chlorination. Lead, zinc or other metals in combination with the gold would also be absorbed by the chlorine; or, again, from some locally chemical peculiarity in the water or the ore, gold held in solution by the water might be again precipitated in the tailings before filtration was complete, and thus be lost.  

Henderson, Clark, De Lacy, Mears, and Deacon all introduced improvements, or what were claimed to be improvements to the process developed by Plattner. These mostly failed because they did not cover every specific gold extraction case. Therefore, where delicate chemical operations were necessary for success, the practice generally failed from want of knowledge on the part of the operator, and many times extensive plants have been pronounced useless from this cause alone. Hence it is not to be wondered that processes requiring such care and uncommon knowledge are not greatly in favor.

Claude Vautin, a man of much practical experience in gold mining and extraction in Queensland, Australia, together with James Cosmo Newbery, analytical chemist to the government of Victoria, developed a process which they claim to combine all the advantages of the foregoing methods, and by the addition of certain improvements in the machinery and mode of treatment to overcome the difficulties which have hitherto prevented the general adoption of the chlorination process.

Description
The materials for treatment are put into the hopper of a revolving barrel. This latter is made of iron, lined with wood and lead, and sufficiently strong to bear a pressure of 100 lb. to the square inch, its capacity being about 30 cwt of ore. The charge falls from the hopper into the chlorinator. Water and chlorine-producing chemicals are added – generally sulphuric acid and calcium chloride – the manhole cover is replaced and screwed down so as to be gas tight. On the opposite side of the barrel there is a valve connected with an air pump, through which air to about the pressure of four atmospheres is pumped in, to dissolve the chlorine gas that is generated, after which the valve is screwed down. The barrel is then set revolving at about ten revolutions a minute, the power being transmitted by a friction wheel. According to the nature of the ore, or the size of the grains of gold, this movement is continued from one to four hours, during which time the gold, from combination with the chlorine gas, has formed a soluble gold chloride, which has all been taken up by the water in the barrel. The chlorinator is then stopped, and the gas and compressed air allowed to escape from the valve through a rubber hose into a vat of lime water, neutralising the chlorine. This is to prevent the inhalation of any chlorine gas by the workmen. 

The manhole cover is then removed and the barrel again set revolving, by which means the contents are thrown automatically into the filter below. This filter is an iron vat lined with lead. It has a false bottom, to which is connected a pipe from a vacuum pump working intermittently. As soon as all the ore has fallen from the chlorinator into the filter, the pump is set going, a partial vacuum is produced in the chamber below the false bottom in the filter, and very rapid filtration results. By this means all the gold chlorides contained in the wet ore may be washed out, a continual stream being passed through it while filtration is going on. The solution running from the filter is continually tested, and when found free from gold, the stream of water is stopped, as is also the vacuum pump. The filter is then tipped up into a truck below, and the tailings run out to the spoil tip. The process of washing and filtration occupies about an hour, during which time another charge may be in process of treatment in the chlorinator above. The discharge from the filter and the washings are run into a vat, and from this they are allowed to pass slowly through a tap into a charcoal filter. During the passage of the liquid through the charcoal filter, the gold in the gold chloride is reduced and is deposited on the charcoal, which, when fully charged, is burnt, the ashes are fused with borax in a crucible, and the gold is obtained.

Precursor Preparation 
For any system of chlorination yet introduced it is necessary to free the ore from sulphides. This is done by roasting according to any of the well-known systems in vogue. It is a matter which requires great care and considerable skill. The heat must be applied and increased slowly and steadily. If, through any neglect on the part of the roaster, the ore is allowed to fuse, the charge is typically thrown away as waste. This roasting applies equally to the Vautin process as to any others. So on this head there is no alteration. One of the most important advantages is the rapidity with which the charge can be treated. In the older styles of treatment the time varied from thirty six to ninety hours. Now this is accomplished in from three to six hours with a practically perfect result. The older processes required a careful damping of the ore, which, to get good results, must leave the ore neither too wet nor too dry. 

Now "damping" is entirely done away with, and in its place water is poured into the barrel. Pressure to the extent of four atmospheres causes chlorine gas to leave its vaporous form. Thus the pressure applied not only enables a strong solution of chlorine to be formed with the water in the barrel, but forces this into contact with the gold through every crevice in the ore. Chlorine gas also takes up any silver which may exist in association with the gold. In the older processes this is deposited as a film of chloride of silver around the fine gold grains, and from its insolubility in water prevents the absorption of the gold. The rotary motion of the barrel in the Newbery–Vautin method counteracts this by continually rubbing the particles together; this frees the particles from any accumulations, so that they always present fresh surfaces for the action of the solvent. Again, the short time the ore is in contact with the chlorine does not allow of the formation of hydrochloric acid, which has a tendency to precipitate the gold from its soluble form in the water before being withdrawn from the chlorinator.

Previously, when the ore was very fine or contained slimes, the difficulty of filtration was increased, sometimes in extreme cases to such an extent that chlorination became impracticable. By the introduction of the vacuum pump this is greatly facilitated; then by making the action intermittent a jigging motion is given to the material in the filter which prevents any clogging except in cases of extreme fineness.

The advantage of using charcoal as a reducing agent for chloride of gold was pointed out by James Newbery some twenty years ago; four or five years since the idea was patented in the United States, but as this was given gratis to the world years before, the patent did not hold good. The form of precipitation generally adopted was to add sulphate of iron to the liquid drawn from the filter. This not only threw down the gold it contained, but also the lime and magnesia. Then very great care was necessary, and a tedious process had to be gone through to divide the gold from these. Now, by filtration through charcoal everything that is soluble in hydrochloric acid passes away with the water; for instance, lime and magnesia, which before gave such great trouble. In passing through the charcoal, the chloride of gold is decomposed and all fine gold particles are taken up by the charcoal, so that it is coated by what appears to be a purple film.

Should copper be associated with the gold, the water, after running through the charcoal filter, is passed over scrap iron, upon which the copper is precipitated by a natural chemical action. If silver is contained in the ore, it is found among the tailings in the filter, as silver chloride which is insoluble in water. Should the quantity prove sufficiently large, it may be leached out in the usual way by hyposulphites.

An advantage common to all systems of chlorination is that ores may be crushed dry and treated, so that the loss from float gold may be avoided. An advantage of dissolution with chlorine gas instead of amalgamation with mercury is that the ore need not be crushed so finely. Roasting takes the place of fine crushing, as the ore from the roasting furnace is either found somewhat spongy in texture or the grains of silica in which fine gold may be encased are split or flawed by the fire. For quicksilver amalgamation very fine crushing is necessary to bring all gold particles in contact with it. Quicksilver being so thick in substance, it will not find its way readily in and out of a microscopically fine spongy body or through very fine flaws in grains of silica, whereas chlorine gas or a solution of liquefied chlorine does this, and absorbs the gold far more readily.

There are cases when gold is contained in ores in what is known as a perfectly "free" form—that is, there is an absence of all sulphides, arsenides, etc. When it is not practicable to extract it either with the ordinary forms of quicksilver amalgamation of or any process of chlorination, without first roasting. This is because the finer gold is locked up inside fine grains of silica and hydrated oxide of iron. No ordinary crushing will bring this fine enough, but when roasting is resorted to by drawing it rapidly through a furnace heated to a cherry red, these grains are split up so that chlorine gas is enabled to penetrate to the gold.

It may be said that an equally clever chemist will be required to work this improved process as compared with those that have fallen into disuse, mainly from want of knowledge among the operators. To a certain extent this is so. The natural chemical actions are not so delicate, but an ignorant operator would spoil this process, as he does nearly every other. When a vein is discovered, practice shows that its strongest characteristics are consistently carried throughout it wherever it bears gold. Before Newbery and Vautin leave a purchaser to deal himself with their process, they get large samples of his ore to their works and there experiment continually until a practically perfect result is obtained; then any one with a moderate amount of knowledge can work with the formula supplied. It has been their experience that the ore from any two mines rarely presents the same characteristics. Experiments are begun by treating very coarse crushings. These, if not satisfactory, are gradually reduced until the desired result is obtained.

To treat the whole body of ore from a mine, dry crushing is strongly recommended. To accomplish this in the most efficient manner, a stone breaker which will reduce to about ¼ inch cubes is necessary. For subsequent crushing Kroms rolls have, up to the present time, proved most satisfactory. They will crush with considerable evenness to a thirty mesh, which is generally sufficient. The crushings are then roasted in the ordinary way in a reverberatory furnace and the whole of the roastings are passed through the machine we have just described. By this it is claimed that over 90 per cent. of the gold can be extracted at very much the same cost as the processes now in general use in gold producing countries, which on the average barely return 50 per cent. If so, the gentlemen who have brought forward these improvements deserve all the success their process promises.

References

Chemical processes
Metallurgical processes
Gold mining